Canal 10 (call sign LU 92 TV) is an Argentine television station located in General Roca, Province of Río Negro. Channel 10 is affiliated with El Trece. The station begins its daily schedule at noon, and offers a variety of shows including news, soap operas, talk shows, comedies and cultural programs. It began operations in 1982 and produces around 20% of its programming.

External links
Official website

Television stations in Argentina
Television channels and stations established in 1982